The 1999 Ohio State Buckeyes football team represented Ohio State University in the 1999 NCAA Division I-A football season. The Buckeyes compiled a 6–6 record. They missed out on their first bowl game since the 1988 team when John Cooper joined as head coach.

Schedule

Personnel

Season summary

vs. Miami (FL)

UCLA 

Source:

Ohio

Cincinnati

Wisconsin

Purdue

Penn State

Minnesota

Iowa 

    
    
    
    
    
    
    
    

Ken-Yon Rambo 7 Rec, 179 Yds

Michigan State

Illinois

Michigan

Rankings

2000 NFL draftees

References
]

Ohio State
Ohio State Buckeyes football seasons
Ohio State Buckeyes football